Brian John Law (born 1 January 1970 in Merthyr Tydfil) is a Welsh former professional footballer and Wales international.

Club career

Law began his career with Queens Park Rangers making his debut against Sheffield Wednesday at  Loftus Road in the final game of the 1987 season, making a total of 20 appearances for the  side before being forced into retirement in 1991 due to a tendon injury. Law spent three years outside of football on a backpacking trip around the world, before returning in 1994 after discovering his injury was able to withstand the rigours of professional football. He joined Wolverhampton Wanderers, who were required to pay £34,000 to Law's insurance company for the compensation he had received on retirement and £100,000 to his former club Queens Park Rangers. During his time with Wolves, Law was arrested after driving a bus while drunk, later receiving a fine and community service.

After initially beginning to establish himself in the first team, Law was forced to undergo ankle reconstruction surgery and never managed to regain his place in the side, eventually moving to Millwall in 1997. He made 47 appearances as club captain in all competitions during his first season at The New Den and remained a regular in the first team at the start of the following season before a knee injury forced him out of the side after less than one month of the 1998–99 season. He was later released by Millwall in 2000, never playing professional football again.

International career

Law played for Wales U15 school boys, represented and captained the Youth team at U16, U18, U21s as well as the B team against England at Tranmere (5/12/90). Despite having only played a handful of games for Queens Park Rangers, Law was called up to the Wales senior squad in September 1988 (Holland) when, Rangers coach and Wales assistant manager, Peter Shreeves recommended him to Wales manager Terry Yorath after an injury crisis had resulted in a large number of withdrawals from the squad. He was an unused substitute against Holland, Italy and Malta however, he was handed his debut on 25 April 1990 in a 4–2 defeat to Sweden. Law was recalled to the squad, after his 2-year retirement from the game, for the 3-1 defeat away to Bulgaria (29/3/95).

After football

Following his retirement, Law earned a degree in sports science after undertaking a three-year course at Roehampton University. He later set up his own charities named Fit for Life and Sozo in 2003, designed to give teenagers in Birmingham access to sports such as football, hockey and streetball as well as set up musical workshops, resulting in Urban Chart success, reaching Number 7 with 'Detention'  Artist : C4 ft Romo.

References

External links

1970 births
Living people
Footballers from Merthyr Tydfil
Welsh Christians
Welsh footballers
Wales international footballers
Queens Park Rangers F.C. players
Wolverhampton Wanderers F.C. players
Millwall F.C. players
English Football League players
Association football defenders